Richard Cashin (born April 17, 1953) is an American rower. He competed in the men's eight event at the 1976 Summer Olympics. He graduated from Harvard University and Harvard Business School.

References

1953 births
Living people
American male rowers
Olympic rowers of the United States
Rowers at the 1976 Summer Olympics
Sportspeople from Washington, D.C.
Harvard Crimson rowers
Harvard Business School alumni
Pan American Games medalists in rowing
Pan American Games silver medalists for the United States
Rowers at the 1979 Pan American Games